The Tara Brooch is an Irish Celtic brooch, dated to the late-7th or early-8th century, of the pseudo-penannular type (i.e., with a fully closed head or hoop). It is made from bronze, silver and gold, with a head formed from a circular ornate ring that is intricately decorated on both sides. Its upper half is hollow while the lower half is solid with fused terminals. The brooch was constructed from numerous individually made pieces, and its front and reverse sides are both decorated with around 50 inserted cast panels containing highly ornate filigree. The borders and terminals contain multiple panels holding multi-coloured studs, interlace patterns, filigree and Celtic spirals. The brooch is widely considered the most complex and ornate of its kind, and would have been commissioned to be worn as a fastener for the cloak of a high ranking cleric or as ceremonial insignia of high office for a High King of Ireland in Irish Early Medieval society.

The brooch was buried on the east coast of Ireland sometime during the 11th or 12th century, most likely to protect it from Viking or Norman invaders. It lay undiscovered until around 1850. Despite its title, it was found not at the Hill of Tara, but on or near the beach around Bettystown on the coast of County Meath. The name by which it became known was chosen by its first commercial owner, the jeweller George Waterhouse, as a marketing ploy for selling copies during the height of the 19th century Celtic Revival. For this reason, many art historians describe it with inverted commas as the "Tara" brooch.

Its decoration and ornamentation is so detailed and minute that in parts it can only be fully seen using magnification, leading to one 19th century critic writing that it was "more like the work of fairies than of human beings". Art historians see only the contemporary Hunterston Brooch (c. 700 AD) as an equal in craftsmanship and design. The archaeologist Niamh Whitfield called it "the most ornate and intricate piece of medieval jewellery ever found in Ireland", while the NMI describes it as representing "the pinnacle of early medieval Irish metalworkers’ achievement". It was acquired by the Royal Irish Academy in 1868, and transferred to the National Museum of Ireland in 1890 where it remains on permanent display.

Function

Ornate zoomorphic brooches made from gilt and silver became status symbols in Early Medieval Ireland. As gold torcs were used by Celtic Iron Age chieftains to indicate rank, by the 7th century Irish kings had adopted the late Roman Empire use of brooches to fulfil this purpose. The tradition continued in the Byzantine empire; contemporary mosaics in the Basilica of San Vitale show the 6th century emperor Justinian wearing an imperial brooch on a purple cloak. The Tara brooch was likely made for a High King of Ireland or high ranking dignitary or cleric, probably from the Kingdom of Brega, a branch of the Uí Néills, who ruled over the area in the early Medieval period. The owner would have worn it on ceremonial occasions.

From depictions in illuminated manuscripts it is known that they were generally worn over purple dye cloaks (brats in Gaelic) and placed just below the right shoulder. Positioning the brooch below the right shoulder was another tradition that originated from the Romans, whose military placed it there so as to keep their cloak on the left and not impede access to their sword.

Fully sealed brooches were sealed by placing the pin within the gap and rotating it 90 degrees. Penannular brooch heads, such as the Tara Brooch, were too small to have pushed through cloth. Instead, it was likely fixed by pushing the pin shaft through the cloth, and fastened horizontally behind the head with stitches running through loops on the borders, and further secured by wrapping the chain around the pin.

Dating

Penannular brooches were introduced to Ireland in the 5th century by craftsmen working in Roman Britain. By the mid-9th century, Irish brooches were more elaborate than Anglo-Saxon examples. They had silver rather than bronze bases, more decorated pinheads, a wider variety of inlay material such as red gold, amber, enamel, millefiori and glass, and larger terminals which had become the focal point for decoration.

Goldsmithing was already a significant craft in prehistoric Irish society. Through trade and missionary contacts with Anglo-Saxon, Frankish and Lombardic cultures, by the 7th century Irish craftsmen had developed a high degree of virtuosity and sophistication in goldwork in a style sometimes referred to as "Hiberno-Saxon" or "late Celtic".

The Tara brooch is dated to the late-7th or early-8th century, with a majority of archeologists including Niamh Whitfield estimating it to the very early 8th century. Most datings are based on technical analysis and stylistic comparisons, in particular to its many similarities to the Hunterston Brooch, produced in either Ireland or western Scotland at the turn of the 8th century, and the Lindisfarne Gospels produced in Northumberland in the early 8th century. In the late 19th century, the antiquarian Margaret Stokes was the first to observe that the use of trumpet spirals places it at least at the end of the so-called "Golden Age" of Insular art, given that the design had fallen out of use by 1050.

Common design elements between the Hunterston and Tara brooches and the Lindisfarne Gospels include their curvilinear patterns, renderings of the animal interlace and the style of the rows of birds. Archeologists now believe that the workshops behind these three objects were in contact, sharing techniques and design ideas. However a key difference between the Tara and Hunterston brooches is that the latter, based on its later-phase runic inscriptions, seems to have been in use and above ground for centuries after the Tara Brooch was buried for safe-keeping.

The Irish style drew influence from Anglo-Saxon formats and the chip carving and inlay methods of Germanic polychrome jewelry. In addition, by the 7th century, Irish missionaries had become exposed to Central European and Mediterranean cultures. Whitfield has noted that Ireland was then relatively outward looking and cosmopolitan – compared to the later Middle Ages – and that "it is not surprising that it should have produced jewels which reflected European fashions".

Description
The Tara Brooch is widely considered the most elaborately constructed and decorated surviving Insular object, with metalwork that exceeds in richness of ornamentation both the 8th century Ardagh and early 9th century Derrynaflan chalices. It is older than both, and one of the earliest Insular metalwork pieces to depict animals in the zoomorphic style that became widespread in Irish art between the 8th and late 12th centuries.

It is of the pseudo-penannular type, in that the hoop is fully circular but does not have a gap between its terminals through which a fastening pin could pass. It is bilaterally symmetrical with a basic structure of a circular hook, semi-circular and linked terminals, a long pin, and a string likely used for additional support to keep it in place against the wearers cloth. Although its core is in silver, its surface is so highly gilded and decorated at every point that the silver is barely visible.

It is composed of many individually formed pieces, with most of its filigree decorations inserted into small trays. Eighteen of these inserts survive, out of a total of twenty-eight trays.

The brooch's complex geometry includes concentric and ancillary circles, rectangular inserts, and an outline likely planned with sketches made with a compass on parchment. This is all the more likely, given the high number of detailed and complex patterns condensed into very small spaces.

Head

The head (or "hoop", or "ring") is made from cast and gilt silver and is decorated on both sides using techniques and patterns that are both innovative and influenced by the Iron Age La Tène style. The head consists of two large concentric circles forming its outline, and around 28 differently sized decorative panels and a series of rounded studs lining both arms. The head is open on its top half, while the lower half is made of two fused terminals, and is thus solid and closed (i.e. pseudo-penannular), although its design does suggest an opening.

The front is lined with twenty-eight sunken panels soldered onto the gold sheets. The panels are held in place by the then new technique of "jewellers' stitches" (also known as "bead settings" or "milli-graining"), that is intricate and complex filigree patterns formed by minute bands of silver wire. Eighteen panels retain their gilt filigree; the others are either corroded or have been broken-off since the brooch was rediscovered in 1850.

Other decorative elements include cast depictions of animal (mostly thin-bodied fish) and abstract motifs, which are separated by studs of glass, enamel and amber.

The reverse is equally decorated, which is unusual given that, in use, it would have been hidden against the wearer's garment. It contains rows of chip-carved interlace animals and birds terminating in trumpet (diverging) spirals in the Ultimate La Tène style.

The friezes on the head contain chip-carved roundels (circular discs). Other La Tène elements include the patterns around the center of the head and terminals, which are silver and a dark red at the terminals but lined with gold at the head.

Terminals

The three large and thin panels on the front-side of the terminals are intended to represent the gap in open brooches. They are richly ornamented with filigree and a row of three studs. The reverse is coloured in gold, black and red and contains further La Tène designs including a frieze of four roundels. The hoop and terminals are joined by silver grilled glass studs in red and blue that adopt contemporary Germanic garnet cloisonné techniques, and in part resemble those on the 8th-century Moylough Belt-Shrine and Ardagh Chalice (8 and 9th-centuries). The combination of red and blue glass is unusual for the period.

The reverse contains two trapezoids in the La Tène style, set against a silver and niello background. On each side, the bridge between the head and terminals contains a single large dome shaped stud. The two terminals and their bridge resemble the heads of two beasts biting at either other.

Pin and chain

The pin is attached to the upper-end of the head by a long oval and gilded panel shaped as a serpent with glass eyes. It is hinged to two ancillary panels with paired animal heads (which may be wolves or dragons) at the ends, and two human faces formed from purple glass.

The plaited chain is made of sliver and plaited wire, and is attached to the hook by a swivel. Most likely, it was wrapped around pieces of the garment to hold the brooch more securely. Other theories suggest it was used as a safety chain to prevent it being dropped, or that the brooch was once part of a pair linked together by the chain.

Condition

The brooch was almost fully intact when discovered but has sustained substantial losses since. Ten of the front inserts and three studs are now missing, while two more have lost their filigree. Comparison with mid-19th century photographs show that when found, the brooch was missing only a single panel.

The earliest surviving reproductions are two 1852 wood engravings which show it, according to Whitfield, "in near perfect condition" with the majority of the now missing filigree, studs, and inserted interlace designs intact.

Discovery

Although the brooch is named after the Hill of Tara, the seat and necropolis of the High Kings of Ireland, it was never connected to either Tara or the High Kings of Ireland. The brooch was found in c. 1850 on the beach at Bettystown, near Laytown, in County Meath, not far from Drogheda and about 25 kilometers from Tara. The finder, the son of a local peasant woman, is said to have found it in a container buried in the sand, though it is likely that it was found inland, by a river and she said it was found at the beach to avoid a legal claim by the landowner.

The title was invented by an early owner, the Dublin jeweller George Waterhouse, for marketing reasons, so that his reproductions would be more culturally resonant. At the time, Waterhouse's main source of income was selling replicas of recently found Celtic Revival jewellery, and according to Whitfield was "in the habit of attaching romantic and high-sounding names to brooches of which they sold replicas".

The circumstances of its finding meant that no contemporary archeological survey was made of the find-spot. However, late 20th century excavations of the area by the beach found a large burial site in use from the pre-historic to the Early medieval period. This has led to speculation that the brooch was buried as part of a hoard, but as of yet no other objects have been found. Equally, the date and reasons for its burial are unknown, mostly likely it was placed in the earth to hide it from Viking or Norman invaders, or following a defeat at battle. A 12th century codex, the Book of Leinster, contains a section titled "The siege of Howth" which mentions a precious brooch buried after a defeat, leading some art historians to speculate that a similar fate befell the Tara Brooch.

19th century reception
Celtic Revival jewellery become fashionable in the 1840s. Utilising this trend, Waterhouse later placed the Tara Brooch as the centerpiece of his replica Celtic brooches in his Dublin shop, and exhibited it at the Great Exhibition of 1851 in London, the Great Industrial Exhibition of 1853 in Dublin, and Exposition Universelle of 1855 in Paris. His Tara brooch replicas were smaller by about a third than the original and far simpler in design. Waterhouse chose the brooch's name, deliberately but falsely linking it to the site associated with the High Kings of Ireland, "fully aware that this would feed the Irish middle-class fantasy of being descended from them". He produced a number of replicas, which were generally smaller and less detailed than the original.

The Dublin exhibition was visited by Queen Victoria who had an interest in the Hill of Tara, liked these Celtic brooches and purchased a number of facsimiles of the brooch, although she did not know that it had actually been found in Bettystown. Prince Albert had already bought two similar pieces for her when the two of them visited Dublin in 1849.

In 1868, the brooch was sold to the Royal Irish Academy. By the 1870s, "Tara brooch" had become a generic term for Celtic Revival brooches, some of which were by then being made by Indian workshops for export to Europe.

Notes

References

Sources

 
 
 
 
 
 
 
 
 
 
 
 
 
  
 
 
 
 Whitfield, Niamh. "Motifs and techniques in Early Medieval Celtic filigree". In: Moss, Rachel (ed). Making and Meaning in Insular Art. Dublin: Four Courts Press, 2007.

External links
Tara Brooch page on the NMI website
The Discovery of the Tara Brooch by Niamh Whitfield, 2019 podcast

Celtic brooches
Collection of the National Museum of Ireland
History of County Meath
Silver-gilt objects